"Life in Mono" is the debut single by English trip hop duo Mono, which consisted of singer Siobhan de Maré and musician Martin Virgo. It was released on the band's first EP in 1996 which contained various remixes, most notably two by the Propellerheads. It was released again in 1997 on the band's only album, Formica Blues.

Background
The song was used as the theme to the 1998 version of the movie Great Expectations (reportedly chosen by actor Robert De Niro), appearing in the Daria episode "Monster", as well as being used for the launch television advert for the new Rover 25. It was covered by Emma Bunton in 2006 for her third album, also titled Life in Mono.

The chorus consists of "ingenue, I just don't know what to do" repeated; the word was a late addition in songwriting, to rhyme with "I just don't know what to do".

It was also used in the television series La Femme Nikita, in season 2 episode 14.

Reception
Billboard called the song's usage in Great Expectations an example of film music that "works", citing its "anguished" lyrics as complementary to Ethan Hawke's character's predicaments, and comparing de Maré's voice to those of Roberta Flack and Billie Holiday.

In the U.S., Mercury Records marketed the single in a campaign aimed to "build awareness at both the radio and club levels", shipping promotional singles to modern rock-format radio stations on 10 February, and to nightclubs at about the same time.  Promotion to Top 40 stations followed later on. The single's sales only allowed it to chart in the lower echelons of the Billboard Hot 100, peaking at number 70 (though it did reach at least 19 on the Top Heatseekers chart), but radio airplay and requests allowed it to reach 28 on the Modern Rock Tracks chart.

Charts

References

1996 debut singles
1998 singles
English electronic songs
Emma Bunton songs
Trip hop songs
1996 songs
The Echo Label singles
Song recordings produced by Jim Abbiss